Hypothiocyanite is the anion [OSCN]− and the conjugate base of hypothiocyanous acid (HOSCN). It is an organic compound part of the thiocyanates as it contains the functional group SCN. It is formed when an oxygen is singly bonded to the thiocyanate group. Hypothiocyanous acid is a fairly weak acid; its acid dissociation constant (pKa) is 5.3.

Hypothiocyanite is formed by peroxidase catalysis of hydrogen peroxide and thiocyanate:

 H2O2 + SCN− → OSCN− + H2O

As a bactericide 

Hypothiocyanite occurs naturally in the antimicrobial immune system of the human respiratory tract in a redox reaction catalyzed by the enzyme lactoperoxidase. It has been researched extensively for its capabilities as an alternative antibiotic as it is harmless to human body cells while being cytotoxic to bacteria. The exact processes for making hypothiocyanite have been patented as such an effective antimicrobial has many commercial applications.

Mechanism of action 

Lactoperoxidase-catalysed reactions yield short-lived intermediary oxidation products of SCN−, providing antibacterial activity.

The major intermediary oxidation product is hypothiocyanite OSCN−, which is produced in an amount of about 1 mole per mole of hydrogen peroxide. At the pH optimum of 5.3, the OSCN− is in equilibrium with HOSCN. The uncharged HOSCN is considered to be the greater bactericidal of the two forms. At pH 7, it was evaluated that HOSCN represents 2% compare to OSCN− 98%.

The action of OSCN− against bacteria is reported to be caused by sulfhydryl (SH) oxidation.

The oxidation of -SH groups in the bacterial cytoplasmic membrane results in loss of the ability to transport glucose and also in leaking of potassium ions, amino acids and peptide.

OSCN− has also been identified as an antimicrobial agent in milk, saliva, tears, and mucus.

OSCN− is considered as a safe product as it is not mutagenic.

Relation to cystic fibrosis 

Initially, this particular lactoperoxidase-catalyzed compound was originally discovered while viewing the specific environment of cystic fibrosis patients' weakened respiratory immune system against bacterial infection.

Symptoms of cystic fibrosis include an inability to secrete sufficient quantities of SCN− which results in a shortage of necessary hypothiocyanite, resulting in increasing mucous viscosity, inflammation and bacterial infection in the respiratory tract.

Lactoferrin with hypothiocyanite has been granted orphan drug status by the EMEA and the FDA.

Naturally, the discovery correlated with studies exploring different methods seeking to further gain alternative antibiotics, understanding that most older antibiotics are decreasing in effectiveness against bacteria with antibiotic resistance.

OSCN−, which is not an antibiotic, has proved efficacy on superbugs including MRSA reference strains, BCC, Mucoid PA

Schema of LPO/SCN−/H2O2 in human lung

Efficacy range 
Non exhaustive list of microorganisms.

Bacteria (Gram-positive and -negative)

Acinetobacter spp.
Aeromonas hydrophila
Bacillus brevis
Bacillus cereus
Bacillus megaterium
Bacillus subtilis
Burkholderia cepacia
Campylobacter jejuni
Capnocytophaga ochracea
Corynebacterium xerosis
Enterobacter cloacae
Escherichia coli
Haemophilus influenzae
Helicobacter pylori 
Klebsiella oxytoca
Klebsiella pneumoniae
Legionella spp.
Listeria monocytogenes 
Micrococcus luteus
Mycobacterium smegmatis
Mycobacterium abscessus
Neisseria spp. 
Pseudomonas aeruginosa 
Pseudomonas pyocyanea
Salmonella spp. 
Selenomonas sputigena
Shigella sonnei
Staphylococcus aerogenes
Staphylococcus aureus
Streptococcus agalactiae 
Streptococcus faecalis
Streptococcus mutans 
Wolinella recta
Xanthomonas campestris
Yersinia enterocolitica

Viruses

Echovirus 11
Herpes simplex virus, HSV
Influenza virus
Human immunodeficiency virus, HIV 
Respiratory syncytial virus, RSV 

Yeasts and moulds

Aspergillus niger
Botryodiplodia theobromae
Byssochlamys fulva
Candida albicans
Colletotrichum gloeosporioide
Colletotrichum musae
Fusarium monoliforme
Fusarium oxysporum
Rhodotula rubra
Sclerotinia spp.

See also 
 Respiratory tract antimicrobial defense system

References

Further reading

 
 
 
 
 
 
 
 
 
 
 
 
 
 
 
 

Anions
Thiocyanates
Chemical pathology
Sulfur ions